Las Meninas (English: The Maids of Honour) is a series of 58 paintings that Pablo Picasso painted in 1957 by performing a comprehensive analysis, reinterpreting and recreating several times Las Meninas by Diego Velázquez. The suite is fully preserved at the Museu Picasso in Barcelona, it is known that he sold the first and second interpretations of the meninas to the American art collector Peggy Guggenheim, owner of the Art of this century gallery. This is a very extensive survey work which consists of 45 versions of the original picture, nine scenes of a dove, three landscapes and a portrait of Jacqueline.

Picasso himself understood this series as a whole and as such donated it to the museum in Barcelona in May 1968 in memory of Jaime Sabartés who died the same year. Picasso said to Sabartés in 1950:

The suite

Exhibits 

The Suite has been shown in the following exhibitions:
 1959 - Les Menines, Galerie Louise Leiris, Paris. 
 1960 - Picasso, Tate Gallery, London. 
 1964 - Pablo Picasso. Exhibition Japan 1964, National Museum of Modern Art, Tokyo, Japan. 
 1964 - Pablo Picasso. Exhibition Japan 1964, National Museum of Modern Art, Kyoto, Japan. 
 1964 - Pablo Picasso. Exhibition Japan 1964, Nagoya City Art Museum, Japan. 
 1966 - 1967 - Hommage à Pablo Picasso, Grand Palais, Paris. 
 1967 - Stedelijk Museum Amsterdam.
 1968 - Museu Picasso, Barcelona. 
 2008 - Forgetting Velázquez: Between 16 May and 28 September 2008, an exhibition at the Museu Picasso in Barcelona, which explains the influence of Velázquez and Picasso's work in other contemporary artists, having as central to Las Meninas.The exhibition, divided into two sections, we could see one side works of the seventeenth century Spanish painters such as Velázquez, Juan Carreño de Miranda or Juan Bautista del Mazo, and some of the Las Meninas by Picasso next to more contemporary productions, with works by artists such as Francisco Goya, Michael Craig-Martin, Josep Maria Sert, Richard Hamilton or Thomas Struth, among others. It was curated by Gertje Utley and Malén Gual.

However, there are several works from the Suite that have been part of other exhibitions. Here you will find the most relevant:

 1980 - Picasso: A Retrospective, MoMA, New York. 
 1981 - Picasso 1881-1973. Exposición Antológica, Museo Español de Arte Contemporáneo, Madrid.
 1985 - La peinture après 1940. Stedelijk Museum, Amsterdam 
 1988 - Picasso in the Soviet Union. Pushkin Museum, Moscow 
 2006 - Picasso. Tradición y vanguardia. Museo Nacional del Prado, Madrid 
 2008 - Picasso et les Maîtres. Grand Palais, Paris 
 2009 - Picasso: Challenging the past. National Gallery of London
 2010 - Picasso: Peace and Freedom. Tate Liverpool

Other versions 

Velázquez's Las Meninas has served as inspiration not only to Picasso. The first follower of Velázquez was certainly his son-in-law Juan Bautista del Mazo, appointed court painter to Philip IV of Spain in 1661. In the portrait of the Infanta Margarita of Spain, 1666, in the backplane, one can see the placement of Charles II and the dwarf Mari Bárbola in a scene similar to Las Meninas by Velázquez. Here is a list of works by artists who also have versioned Las Meninas throughout art history.

 Claudio Bravo, La vista
 Louis Cane, Meninas squatting (1982), private collection
 William Merritt Chase, A Friendly Call (1895), National Gallery of Art
 Philippe Comar, Las Meninas (1978), Centre Georges Pompidou
 Nicola Costantino, Prince Aquiles, after Velázquez (2010)
 Equipo Crónica, El recinte (1971) private collection
 Salvador Dalí, Velázquez pintant la infanta Margarida amb les llums i les ombres de la seva pròpia glòria (1958), Salvador Dalí Museum
 Edgar Degas, Variation on Velázquez's Las Meninas (1857), Neue Pinakothek
 Antonio de Felipe, In-Fanta de llimona II (1992), Iria Souto Catoira collection
 Luca Giordano, Hommage to Velázquez, National Gallery of London
 Alberto Gironella, Cambra Oscura (1975), private collection
 Francisco de Goya, Las Meninas (1780–85) Biblioteca Nacional de España
 Richard Hamilton, Interior II (1964) Tate
 Richard Hamilton, Las Meninas of Picasso (1973) Tate
 Yasumasa Morimura, Daughter of Art History (Princess A), private collection
 Vik Muniz, Las Meninas by Velázquez (the chocolate paintings)(2002)
 Jorge Oteiza, Hommage to Las Meninas (1958), Fundació Juan March
 Giulio Paolini, Contemplator Enim VI (fuori l'autore) (1991)
 Antonio Saura, Infanta i Saba (1962) 
 Josep Maria Sert, Figurí per a Las Meninas (1916), Fundación Juan March
 Soledad Sevilla, Las Meninas Núm. IX (1981-1983)
 John Singer Sargent, The Daughters of Edward Darley Boit (1882), Museum of Fine Arts, Boston.
 Thomas Struth, Museo del Prado 6 (2005), private collection
 Franz von Stuck, Family group (1909), Royal Museums of Fine Arts of Belgium
 Eve Sussman, 89 segons at the Alcázar (2004), private collection
 Manolo Valdés, Reina Marianna (1989), private collection
 Jeff Wall, Picture for Women (1979), Centre Georges Pompidou
 James Abbott McNeill Whistler, Whistler in his studio (1865)
 Joel-Peter Witkin, Las Meninas. New Mexico'' (1987)

References

Bibliography

External links 
 Las Meninas commented at Museu Picasso website

Paintings by Pablo Picasso
1957 paintings
Dogs in art
Paintings about painting